Lecithocera cornutima is a moth in the family Lecithoceridae. It was described by Kyu-Tek Park in 2009. It is found in Thailand.

The wingspan is 12.5–14 mm. The forewings are yellowish brown to dark brown, with the costa pale orange anteriorly. There are five distinct small, pale orange patches from two-thirds to the pre-apex on the costa. The hindwings are orange white, covered with brownish scales along the veins.

Etymology
The species name is derived from Latin cornut (meaning horned) with the Latin superlative ending imus(a).

References

Moths described in 2009
cornutima